Clytocerus is a genus of flies belonging to the family Psychodidae.

The genus was first described by Eaton in 1904.

The species of this genus are found in Europe and Southern Africa.

Species include:
 Clytocerus ocellaris
 Clytocerus tetracorniculatus
 Clytocerus americanus

References

Psychodidae